Nová Ves nad Žitavou is a village and municipality in the Nitra District in western central Slovakia, in the Nitra Region. It has a population of about 1,270 people, with a distribution of approximately 99% Slovak and 1% Magyar. It was first mentioned in historical records in 1355. Since 1925 the village has a football club.

The village has a public library, a gym and a football pitch.

References

External links
  
 https://web.archive.org/web/20070513023228/http://www.statistics.sk/mosmis/eng/run.html

Villages and municipalities in Nitra District